Campos Gerais National Park is a national park in the state of Paraná, Brazil.

Location

It was created on 23 March 2006, and is administered by the Chico Mendes Institute for Biodiversity Conservation.
The park lies in the Paraná municipalities of Ponta Grossa, Castro and Carambeí.
Vegetation includes mixed forest and areas grassland.
Ball cactus and Sinningia leucotricha are endemic.
The terrain is rugged, with cliffs, canyons, faults and caves.
The park holds the main sources of the Tibagi River and the Ribeira de Iguape River.

The area is home to immense rock formations, which impress with their green prairie field shapes.

Conservation

As a National Park the basic objective is the preservation of natural ecosystems of great ecological relevance and scenic beauty, enabling the conduct of scientific research and educational activities, and supporting outdoor recreation ecological tourism.

Notes

Sources

2006 establishments in Brazil
National parks of Brazil
Protected areas of Paraná (state)
Castro, Paraná
Ponta Grossa
Protected areas of the Atlantic Forest